Gabriel S. "Gabi" Tolkowsky (born January 1, 1939) known for cutting the famous Centenary Diamond, is one of the world's most renowned diamond cutters. Known as the father of the modern round brilliant diamond cut. and the great nephew of Marcel Tolkowsky, he is the sixth generation in his family to become well known in the diamond cutting trade.

Family history

In the 1800s Abraham Tolkowsky worked with precious stones.  By the 1840s the family moved to Antwerp. Abraham Tolkowsky's son Maurice established a good reputation in the business.

Isadore and Sam now worked closely alongside their brother Maurice, and their father Abraham. Maurice invented the first diamond bruiting machine, which is fundamental to creating a perfectly round diamond. His brother Sam was elected the first chairman of the Antwerp Diamond Exchange.

Career
Gabriel Tolkowsky began training with his father Jean in 1956 before becoming the Managing Director and Chairman of Diatrada, N.V., a division of De Beers in the 1970s before moving to Worldwide Consultant in 1995.

Centenary Diamond
In 1988, Tolkowsky was commissioned to act as master cutter for the  Centenary Diamond. This monumental diamond remained untouched for over a year while the correct tools and technical conditions were created by Gabi and his team.  The gem was kerfed (hand cleaved) in order to avoid heat- or vibration-related damage from using saws or lasers. In 1991, after working on the project for three years, Tolkowskys Centenary Diamond was officially completed, weighing . It presented 247 facets and has been acknowledged as the largest, most colour-perfect and flawless modern diamond cut in the world.

Golden Jubilee Diamond
During this time, Gabi Tolkowsky was again selected by the De Beers group in order to design and cut the Golden Jubilee Diamond. The Golden Jubilee is the largest faceted diamond in the world, weighing , more than the Cullinan I. The diamond was a  rough stone.  World-famous, it presents 148 facets, has a yellow-brown colour intensified by the brilliant cushion cut.  The Golden Jubilee was chosen as a gift to the King of Thailand to celebrate his 50 years on the throne.

Gabrielle Diamonds

Drawing from techniques learned during the polishing of the Centenary and the Golden Jubilee diamonds, and from his experience with the "Flower Cuts", Gabi created the Gabrielle Diamonds, the world's first triple brilliant cut diamond.

The Gabrielle Diamond in the Round shape consists of 105 facets, 48 facets more than the Classic Round Brilliant cut (with additional 8 crown facets and 40 pavilion facets).  The Gabrielle Diamond was shown by a Light Study to exhibit 200% more scintillation than an excellent-cut classic brilliant diamond, and at the same time exhibited significantly greater brilliance and fire. This was achieved by increasing the path of light through the diamond, so that the diamond appears to sparkle from all angles.

Recognition
He was a major interviewee in The Play of Light, a 2000 documentary film about the creation of a diamond from a rough stone, and in 2003 he was knighted by the Belgian government with the title of Chevalier de L'Ordre du Roi Leopold II, for his services to the diamond industry.

References

External links
 Tolkowsky.com

1939 births
Living people
20th-century Belgian engineers
Diamond cutting
Belgian Jews